Liu Kuo-chuan (born 29 September 1949) is a Taiwanese politician. He was the Deputy Minister of the Veterans Affairs Commission of the Republic of China.

References

1949 births
Living people
Taiwanese Ministers of the Veterans Affairs Council